The 64th annual Venice International Film Festival, held in Venice, Italy, opened on 29 August 2007, with Joe Wright's Atonement and closed 8 September 2007. Host of the event was Italian actress Ambra Angiolini. The Golden Lion for Lifetime Achievement Award was presented to American director Tim Burton. Once again all the films running the contest were shown for the first time as world premieres in keeping with the festival tradition since the Second World War.

Juries
The international juries of the 64th Venice International Film Festival were composed as follows:

Main Competition (Venezia 64)
Zhang Yimou, Chinese film director, producer, writer and actor (Jury President)
Catherine Breillat, French filmmaker, novelist and professor of auteur cinema
Jane Campion, New Zealand screenwriter, producer, and director
Emanuele Crialese, Italian screenwriter and director
Alejandro González Iñárritu, Mexican film director, producer and screenwriter
Ferzan Özpetek, Turkish-Italian film director and screenwriter
Paul Verhoeven, Dutch director, screenwriter and producer

Horizons (Orizzonti)
Gregg Araki, American filmmaker (President)
Frederick Wiseman, American filmmaker, documentarian and theatre director
Hala Alabdalla Yakoub, Syrian director and producer
Giorgia Fiorio, Italian photographer
Ulrich Gregor, German critic

Opera Prima ("Luigi de Laurentiis" Award for a Debut Film)
Bill Mechanic, American film producer (President)
Rupert Everett, English actor and writer
Randa Chahal, Lebanese director, producer and screenwriter
Liu Jie, Chinese director
Valeria Solarino, Italian actress

Short Film Competition (Corto Cortissimo)
, French director (President)
Yasmine Kassari, Moroccan director
Roberto Perpignani, Italian film editor

Official selection

In competition
The competitive section of the official selection is an international competition of feature films in 35mm and digital HD format, running for the Golden Lion.

Highlighted title indicates the Golden Lion winner.

Out of competition
Shown below are new works by authors who were honored in past festivals, as well as movies shown in the midnight time band.

Horizons
New trends of cinema with full-length films in 35mm and digital format, and documentary-movies.

Highlighted title indicate the Horizons Awards for Best Film and Best Documentary respectively.

Short film competition
The following films in 35mm, whose length does not exceed 30 minutes, were selected for the short film competition (Corto Cortissimo):

Highlighted title indicates the Lion for Best Short Film winner.

Secret History of Italian Cinema 4
Special monographic sessions dedicated to the secret story of Italian cinema. This is the fourth part of the retrospective, initiated at the 61st edition of the festival;  the patron of this edition, focused on Italian Spaghetti Western, was the director Quentin Tarantino.

New Versions Restored
As a pre-opening event of this future section, the restored Digital Cinema version of David Wark Griffith’s Intolerance (1916) was screened as a world premiere, in collaboration with the Le Giornate del Cinema Muto di Pordenone. "Venice Classics" which features restored classic films and documentaries on cinema, started as a new section in 2012, at the 69th Venice International Film Festival.

Autonomous sections

Venice International Film Critics' Week
The following feature films were selected to be screened as In Competition for the 22nd Venice International Film Critics’ Week:

Venice Days
The following films were selected for the 4th edition of Venice Days (Giornate Degli Autori) autonomous section:

Highlighted title indicates the Lion Of The Future winner.

Awards

Official selection
The following Official Awards were conferred at the 64th edition:

In Competition (Venezia 64)
 Golden Lion: Lust, Caution (Se, Jie) by Ang Lee
 Silver Lion for Best Director: Brian De Palma for Redacted
 Special Jury Prize (ex aequo):
I'm Not There by Todd Haynes
The Secret of the Grain (La graine et le mulet) by Abdellatif Kechiche 
 Volpi Cup for Best Actor: Brad Pitt for The Assassination of Jesse James by the Coward Robert Ford
 Volpi Cup for Best Actress: Cate Blanchett for I'm Not There
 Marcello Mastroianni Award for Best Young Actor or Actress: Hafsia Herzi for The Secret of the Grain
 Golden Osella for Best Cinematography: Rodrigo Prieto for Lust, Caution
 Golden Osella for Best Screenplay: Paul Laverty for It's a Free World...
 Special Lion for Overall Work: Nikita Mikhalkov

Special Awards
 Golden Lion for lifetime achievement to Bernardo Bertolucci and Tim Burton

Horizons awards (Premi Orizzonti)
 Best Film: Sügisball (Autumn Ball) by Veiko Õunpuu
 Best Documentary: Wuyong (Useless) by Jia Zhangke
 Special Mention: Death in the Land of Encantos (Kagadanan sa banwaan ning mga engkanto) by Lav Diaz

Short Film awards (Corto Cortissimo Lion)
 Silver Lion for Best Short Film: Dog Altogether by Paddy Considine
 UIP Award for the Best European Short Film: Lightborne (Alumbramiento) by Eduardo Chapero-Jackson
 Special Mention: Stone People (Lyudi iz kamnya) by Leonid Rybakov

Autonomous sections
The following official and collateral awards were conferred to films of the autonomous sections:

Venice International Film Critics' Week
 Critics' Week Award: The Most Distant Course (Zui yao yuan de ju li) by Lin Jing-jie
 Isvema Award: The Girl by the Lake by Andrea Molaioli

Venice Days (Giornate Degli Autori)
 Lion of the Future
Luigi De Laurentiis Award for a Debut Film: La Zona (La zona) by Rodrigo Plá
 FEDIC Award: Non pensarci by Gianni Zanasi
 Label Europa Cinemas: Tricks (Sztuczki) by Andrzej Jakimowski
 Brian Award: Sympathy for the Lobster (Le ragioni dell'aragosta) by Sabina Guzzanti
 Laterna Magica Prize: Tricks by Andrzej Jakimowski
 Cinema for Peace Award: The Zone by Rodrigo Plá
 Award of the City of Rome: The Zone by Rodrigo Plá
 EIUC Award (Venice Days): Under the Bombs (Sous les bombes) by Philippe Aractingi

Other collateral awards
The following collateral awards were conferred to films of the official selection:

 FIPRESCI Awards
 Best Film (Main competition): The Secret of the Grain (La graine et le mulet) by Abdellatif Kechiche 
 Best Film (Horizons): Jimmy Carter Man from Plains by Jonathan Demme
 SIGNIS Award: In the Valley of Elah by Paul Haggis
 Special Mention: The Secret of the Grain by Abdellatif Kechiche & It's a Free World... by Ken Loach
 Francesco Pasinetti Awards:
 Best Film: Non pensarci by Gianni Zanasi
 Special Mention: Valzer by Salvatore Maira
 Best Actor: Toni Servillo for The Girl by the Lake Best Actress: Valeria Solarino for Valzer C.I.C.A.E. Award: With the Girl of Black Soil (Geomen tangyi sonyeo oi) by Soo-il Jeon (Horizons)
 Prize of the Forum for Cinema and Literature: Atonement by Joe Wright
 Little Golden Lion: The Darjeeling Limited by Wes Anderson
 Queer Lion: The Speed of Life by Ed Radtke
 Queer Lion – Special Mention: Sleuth by Kenneth Branagh
 Young Cinema Award:
 Best Film in Competition: The Secret of the Grain (La graine et le mulet) by Abdellatif Kechiche
 Best Film in Parallel Sections: Under the Bombs (Sous les bombes) by Philippe Aractingi
 Best Italian Film: Non pensarci by Gianni Zanasi
 Open Prize: Nightwatching by Peter Greenaway
 Doc/It Award: The Beloved (L'Aimée) by Arnaud Desplechin (Horizons)
 Special Mention: Crossing the Line (Il passaggio della linea) by Pietro Marcello (Horizons)
 Lina Mangiacapre Award: With the Girl of Black Soil (Geomen tangyi sonyeo oi) by Soo-il Jeon (Horizons)
 Filmcritica "Bastone Bianco" Award: A Girl Cut in Two (La fille coupée en deux) by Claude Chabrol (Out of competition)
 Future Film Festival Digital Award: Redacted by Brian De Palma
 Biografilm Award: Jimmy Carter Man from Plains by Jonathan Demme
 'CinemAvvenire' Award – Best Film: I'm Not There by Todd Haynes
 EIUC Award:
 Main competition: It's a Free World... by Ken Loach
 Horizons: Jimmy Carter Man from Plains by Jonathan Demme
 Mimmo Rotella Foundation Award: Nightwatching'' by Peter Greenaway

Notes
The prize awarded to Cate Blanchett was received by Heath Ledger on behalf of the actress, who could not be present.

References

External links

Venice Film Festival 2007 Awards on IMDb

Venice Film Festival
Venice
Venice
Venice
Film
August 2007 events in Europe
September 2007 events in Europe